Cemolobus is a genus of long-horned bees in the family Apidae. There is one described species in Cemolobus, C. ipomoeae.

References

Further reading

External links

 

Apinae
Articles created by Qbugbot